Babbar Subhash is an Indian film director, producer and screenwriter who primarily works in Hindi films. He is known for his film collaborations with actor Mithun Chakraborty including Disco Dancer (1982), Kasam Paida Karne Wale Ki (1984), and Dance Dance (1987).

Filmography
Apna Khoon 
Zalim 
Taqdeer Ka Badshah
Disco Dancer 
Kasam Paida Karne Wale Ki 
Aandhi-Toofan
Adventures of Tarzan
Dance Dance 
London Calling 
Commando 
Classic Dance of Love
Dulhan Banoo Main Teri
Divine Lovers 
Nachnewale Gaanewale
Pyar Ke Naam Qurbaan 
Love Love Love 
Aaj Ke Angaarey
Pyar Ka Saaya (as a producer)

References

External links

Hindi-language film directors
20th-century Indian film directors